Mahmoud Farg Kabonga (born 5 May 1986) is an Egyptian footballer (soccer) midfielder or central midfielder or attacking midfielder.

In July 2015, moved to Ittihad Alexandria.

References

External links
 
 https://www.yallakora.com/egyptian-league/2620/player/51471/%D9%85%D8%AD%D9%85%D9%88%D8%AF-%D9%81%D8%B1%D8%AC-%D9%83%D8%A7%D8%A8%D9%88%D9%86%D8%AC%D8%A7

1986 births
Living people
Egyptian footballers
Association football midfielders
Al Ittihad Alexandria Club players
El Raja SC players